Persoonia chapmaniana  is a species of flowering plant in the family Proteaceae and is endemic to the south-west of Western Australia.

Description

Taxonomy and naming
Persoonia chapmaniana was first formally described in 1994 by Peter Weston in the journal Telopea from specimens collected by Charles Chapman of Coorow, near the road between Carnamah and Eneabba in 1981. The specific epithet (chapmaniana) honours the collector of the type specimens.

Distribution and habitat
This geebung grows in woodland near salt lakes between the type location, Coomberdale, Lake Ninan (near Wongan Hills) and Kulja in the Avon Wheatbelt, Geraldton Sandplains and Swan Coastal Plain biogeographic regions.

Conservation status
Persoonia chapmaniana is classified as "Priority Three" by the Government of Western Australia Department of Parks and Wildlife meaning that it is poorly known and known from only a few locations but is not under imminent threat.

References

chapmaniana
Flora of Western Australia
Plants described in 1994
Taxa named by Peter H. Weston